The Philip Taft Labor History Book Award is sponsored by the Cornell University School of Industrial and Labor Relations in cooperation with the Labor and Working-Class History Association for books relating to labor history of the United States. Labor history is considered "in a broad sense to include the history of workers (free and unfree, organized and unorganized), their institutions, and their workplaces, as well as the broader historical trends that have shaped working-class life, including but not limited to: immigration, slavery, community, the state, race, gender, and ethnicity." The award is named after the noted labor historian Philip Taft (1902–1976).

Recipients

Source: ILR School, Cornell University

1978 – David M. Katzman for Seven Days a Week: Women and Domestic Service in Industrializing America
1979 – August Meier and Elliott Rudwick for Black Detroit and the Rise of the UAW
1980 - no award made
1981 – James A. Gross for Reshaping of the National Labor Relations Board: A Study in Economics, Politics, and the Law
1982 – co-winners:  Alice Kessler-Harris for Out to Work: A History of Wage-Earning Women in the United States; and Howell John Harris for The Right to Manage: Industrial Relations Policies of American Business in the 1940s
1983 – Walter Licht for Working for the Railroad
1984 – co-winners:  Paul Avrich for The Haymarket Tragedy; and Robert Zieger for Rebuilding the Pulp and Paper Workers' Union, 1933–1941
1985 – Jacqueline Jones for Labor of Love, Labor of Sorrow: Black Women, Work, and the Family from Slavery to the Present
1986 – Alexander Keyssar for Out of Work: The First Century of Unemployment in Massachusetts
1987 – Jacquelyn Dowd Hall, James Leloudis, Robert Korstad, Mary Murphy, Christopher B. Daly, and Lu Ann Jones for Like a Family: The Making of a Southern Cotton Mill World
1988 – Alan Derickson for Workers' Health, Workers' Democracy: The Western Miners Struggle, 1891–1925
1989 – co-winners:  Joshua Freeman for In Transit: The Transport Workers Union in New York City, 1933–1966; and Philip Scranton for Figured Tapestry: Production, Markets and Power in Philadelphia Textiles, 1855–1941
1990 – Lizabeth Cohen for Making a New Deal: Industrial Workers in Chicago, 1919–1939
1991 – Steve Fraser for Labor Will Rule: Sidney Hillman and the Rise of American Labor
1992 – Douglas Flamming for Creating the Modern South: Millhands and Managers in Dalton, Georgia, 1884–1984
1993 – Peter Way for Common Labour: Workers and the Digging of North American Canals, 1780–1860
1994 – Eileen Boris for Home to Work: Motherhood and the Politics of Industrial Homework in the U.S.
1995 – Robert Zieger for The CIO, 1935–1955
1996 – Thomas J. Sugrue for The Origins of the Urban Crisis: Race and Inequality in Postwar Detroit
1997 – Sanford M. Jacoby for Modern Manors: Welfare Capitalism Since the New Deal
1999 – Joseph McCartin for Labor's Great War: The Struggle for Industrial Democracy and the Origins of Modern American Labor Relations, 1912–1921
2000 – Jefferson R. Cowie for Capital Moves: RCA's 70-Year Quest for Cheap Labor
2001 – Gunther Peck for Reinventing Free Labor: Padrones and Immigrant Workers in the North American West, 1880–1930
2002 – Alice Kessler-Harris for In Pursuit of Equity: Women, Men, and the Quest for Economic Citizenship in 20th Century America
2003 – Nelson Lichtenstein for State of the Union: A Century of American Labor
2004 – co-winners:  Frank Tobias Higbie for Indispensable Outcasts: Hobo Workers and Community in the American Midwest, 1880–1930; and Robert Korstad for Civil Rights Unionism: Tobacco Workers and the Struggle for Democracy in the Mid-Twentieth-Century South
2005 – Dorothy Sue Cobble for The Other Women's Movement: Workplace Justice and Social Rights in Modern America
2006 – James N. Gregory for The Southern Diaspora: How the Great Migrations of Black and White Southerners Transformed America
2007 – Nancy MacLean for Freedom Is Not Enough: The Opening of the American Workplace
2008 – Laurie B. Green for Battling the Plantation Mentality:  Memphis and the Black Freedom Struggle
2009 - co-winners:  Thavolia Glymph for Out of the House of Bondage: The Transformation of the Plantation Household; and Jana K. Lipman for Guantánamo:  A Working-Class History between Empire and Revolution
2010 - Seth Rockman for Scraping By:  Wage Labor, Slavery, and Survival in Early Baltimore
2011 - James D. Schmidt for Industrial Violence and the Legal Origins of Child Labor
2012 - Cindy Hahamovitch for No Man's Land:  Jamaican Guestworkers in America and the Global History of Deportable Labor
2013 – co-winners:  Matt Garcia for From the Jaws of  Victory: The Triumph and Tragedy of Cesar Chavez and the Farm Worker Movement; and Kimberley Phillips for  War! What Is It Good For?: Black Freedom Struggles and the U.S. Military from World War II to Iraq
2014 - Matthew L. Basso for Meet Joe Copper: Masculinity and Race on Montana’s World War II Home Front
2015 - Sven Beckert for Empire of Cotton: A Global History (Knopf)
2016 - co-winners: Nancy Woloch for A Class by Herself:  Protective Laws for Women Workers, 1890s-1990s; and Talitha L. LeFlouria for Chained in Silence:  Black Women and Convict Labor in the New South
2017 - LaShawn Harris for Sex Workers, Psychics, and Numbers Runners: Black Women in New York City's Underground Economy
2018 - Sarah F. Rose for No Right to Be Idle:  The Invention of Disability, 1840s-1930s
2019 - co-winners: Peter Cole (Historian) for Dockworker Power: Race and Activism in Durban and the San Francisco Bay Area; and Joshua Freeman for Behemoth:  A History of the Factory and the Making of the Modern World
2020 - Vincent DiGirolamo for Crying the News: A History of America's Newsboys.
2021 - Nate Holdren for Injury Impoverished:  Workplace Accidents, Capitalism, and Law in the Progressive Era

See also

 List of history awards

References

External links
 Philip Taft Labor History Book Award at the Cornell University School of Industrial and Labor Relations
 Philip Taft Labor History Book Award at lovethebook

American awards
Historiography of the United States
History awards